This is a list of Indian Bengali language films that are scheduled to release in 2022.

January – March

April – June

July – September

October – December

References

External links
 Upcoming Bengali Films

Bengali
2022

Indian Bengali